César Lerner is a film composer.  

He works in the cinema of Argentina.

César Lerner frequently collaborates and performs with Marcelo Moguilevsky. Based in Buenos Aires the Lerner Moguilevsky Dúo plays jazz- and tango-influenced klezmer. The duo accompanied Pope Francis on his visit to Israel in 2014.

Filmography
 Nueve reinas (2000) aka Nine Queens
 Esperando al mesías (2000) aka Waiting for the Messiah
 Aquellos niños (2003)
 El abrazo partido (2004) Lost Embrace
 Derecho de familia (2006) aka Family Law
Rancho Aparte (2007)
Cohen Vs. Rossi (1998)
Lea y Mira dejan su huella (2018)
La Experiencia Judía - de Basavilbaso a Nueva Amsterdam (2019)

References

External links
 

Argentine Jews
Argentine film score composers
Male film score composers
Living people
Year of birth missing (living people)
Place of birth missing (living people)